Sadberge is a village in County Durham, England, situated between Darlington and Stockton-on-Tees. It is administered as part of the borough of Darlington.

History
The village's name is Old Danish for "flat hill", an accurate description of the location of the village from where good views of the surrounding countryside can be obtained. The origin of the name is reflective of the area's high Viking-influence. Placenames with the same root also appear in other Viking-influenced areas, including the village of Sedbergh in the West Riding of Yorkshire (now administered as part of Cumbria).

The wapentake of Sadberge, a manor and liberty named after the village, was a liberty of Northumberland until purchased by the Bishop of Durham in 1189 and gradually incorporated into his County Palatine of Durham.

Facilities
Sadberge is conveniently situated for fast commuting to Teesside. The village has a church, village hall and two pubs.

References

External links

Sadberge Village Website
Tommy Craggs  a local chainsaw carver, created three sculptures on the village green from three trees that had to be felled, a Roman lady, a Viking warrior and a Saxon child.

Villages in County Durham
Places in the Borough of Darlington
Places in the Tees Valley